Westland District Council is the territorial authority for the Westland District of New Zealand.

The council is led by the mayor of Westland, who is currently . There are also eight ward councillors.

Composition

Councillors

 Mayor 
 Northern Ward: Anna Hart, Jenny Keogan, Jane Neale
 Hokitika Ward: David Carruthers, Paul Davidson, Latham Martin
 Southern Ward: Ian Hartsthorne, Ryan Kennedy

History

The council was formed in 1989. Its predesccessors include Hokitika County Council (1868-1989), Ross County Council (1878-1972), and Westland County Council (1876-1989).

In 2020, the council had 205 staff, including 22 earning more than $100,000. According to the right-wing Taxpayers' Union think tank, residential rates averaged $2,601.

References

External links
 Westland District Council

Westland District
Politics of the West Coast, New Zealand
Territorial authorities of New Zealand